Sino-Soviet treaty may refer to:

Sino-Soviet Non-Aggression Pact in 1937
Sino-Soviet Treaty of Friendship and Alliance in 1945
Sino-Soviet Treaty of Friendship in 1950
1991 Sino-Soviet Border Agreement